Branko Bajić (born 4 June 1998) is a Bosnian professional footballer who plays as a defender. He most recently played for Bosnian Premier League club Mladost Doboj Kakanj.

Honours
Radnik Bijeljina
Bosnian Cup: 2015–16

References

External links
Branko Bajić at FC DAC 1904 Profile
B. Bajić Futbal.net

1998 births
Living people
People from Bijeljina
Association football defenders
Bosnia and Herzegovina footballers
Bosnia and Herzegovina youth international footballers
FK Radnik Bijeljina players
FC DAC 1904 Dunajská Streda players
FK Željezničar Sarajevo players
FK Mladost Doboj Kakanj players
Premier League of Bosnia and Herzegovina players
Bosnia and Herzegovina expatriate footballers
Expatriate footballers in Slovakia
Bosnia and Herzegovina expatriate sportspeople in Slovakia